The 2005 Canadian Senior Curling Championships were held March 19 to 27 at the East St. Paul Curling Club in East St. Paul, Manitoba. The winning teams represented Canada at the 2006 World Senior Curling Championships.

Men's

Teams

Standings

Results

Draw 1

Draw 2

Draw 3

Draw 4

Draw 5

Draw 6

Draw 7

Draw 8

Draw 9

Draw 10

Draw 11

Draw 13

Draw 15

Draw 17

Draw 19

Draw 21

Playoffs

Semifinal

Final

Women's

Teams

Standings

Results

Draw 1

Draw 2

Draw 3

Draw 4

Draw 5

Draw 6

Draw 7

Draw 8

Draw 9

Draw 10

Draw 12

Draw 14

Draw 16

Draw 18

Draw 20

Draw 22

Playoffs

Tiebreaker #1

Tiebreaker #2

Semifinal

Final

References

External links
Men's Archived Statistics 
Women's Archived Statistics 

2006
Senior Curling Championships
2005 in Manitoba
Curling in Manitoba
March 2005 sports events in Canada